Artena certior is a species of moth of the family Erebidae first described by Francis Walker in 1858. It is found in Thailand, India and on Java.

References

Catocalinae
Moths described in 1858
Moths of Asia